The Spell is the second studio album by the Swiss progressive metal band Cellar Darling. It was released on 22 March 2019 by Nuclear Blast.

Track listing

Personnel

Musicians
 Anna Murphy – vocals, hurdy-gurdy, flute, keyboards
 Ivo Henzi – guitars, bass
 Merlin Sutter – drums

Charts

References

2019 albums
Cellar Darling albums
Nuclear Blast albums
Death in music